Dominic Louis Serventy (28 March 1904 – 8 August 1988) was a Perth -based Western Australian ornithologist.  He was president of the Royal Australasian Ornithologists Union (RAOU) 1947–1949.  He assisted with the initial organisation of the British Museum's series of Harold Hall Australian ornithological collecting expeditions during the 1960s, also participating in the third (1965) expedition.

Early life
He was born at Brown Hill, Western Australia to parents of Croatian origin.  He was educated at the University of Western Australia and Cambridge University.

Career
He co-authored (with H. M. Whittell) of Birds of Western Australia, (published in five editions between 1948 and 1976), and (with John Warham and his brother Vincent Serventy, a popular naturalist) of The Handbook of Australian Sea-birds (1971).

Legacy
He is commemorated by the RAOU's D.L. Serventy Medal which is awarded annually for outstanding published work on birds in the Australasian region.

Dominic Serventy is commemorated in the scientific name of a species of Australian lizard, Ctenotus serventyi. Dominic and Vincent Serventy are commemorated in the species' epithet of the extinct cormorant Microcarbo serventyorum, described by Gerard Frederick van Tets in 1994.

Honours
 1952 - elected a Fellow of the RAOU
 1956 - awarded the Australian Natural History Medallion
 1970 - awarded the Tasmanian Royal Society Medal
 1972 - appointed Ridder (Knight) in the Most Excellent Order of the Golden Ark by Prince Bernhard of the Netherlands

Notes

References
 Kloot, Tess. (1986). "A Regular Correspondence … On Matters Ornithological". La Trobe Journal 38: 42–47. Accessed 10 September 2007
 Robin, Libby. (2001). The Flight of the Emu: a hundred years of Australian ornithology 1901-2001. Carlton, Vic. Melbourne University Press. 

Australian ornithologists
1904 births
1988 deaths
20th-century Australian zoologists